Gorno Kosovrasti is a village in the municipality of Debar, North Macedonia.

It historically has been identified as a Mijak village.

Demographics
Gorno Kosovrasti has traditionally been inhabited by a Muslim Macedonian (Torbeš) population that speaks the Macedonian language.

According to the 2002 census, the village had a total of 818 inhabitants. Ethnic groups in the village include:

Macedonians 578
Turks 222
Others 18

References

External links

Villages in Debar Municipality
Macedonian Muslim villages